The Women's madison competition at the 2020 UCI Track Cycling World Championships was held on 29 February 2020.

Results
The race was started at 17:10. 120 km were raced with 12 sprints.

References

Women's madison
UCI Track Cycling World Championships – Women's madison